The Bolivia national futsal team is controlled by the Federación Boliviana de Fútbol, the governing body for futsal in Bolivia and represents the country in international futsal competitions, such as the World Cup and the Copa América.

Tournament records

FIFA Futsal World Cup
 1989 - did not enter
 1992 - did not enter
 1996 - did not enter
 2000 - did not qualify
 2004 - did not qualify
 2008 - did not qualify
 2012 - did not qualify
 2016 - did not qualify
 2020 - did not qualify

Copa América
 1992 – did not enter
 1995 – did not enter
 1996 – did not enter
 1997 – did not enter
 1998 – did not enter
 1999 – did not enter
 2000 – 4th place
 2003 – 9th place
 2008 – 8th place
 2011 – 8th place
 2015 – did not enter
 2017 – 7th place
 2022 – 8th place

FIFA Futsal World Cup qualification (CONMEBOL)/CONMEBOL Preliminary Competition
 2012 – 9th place
 2016 – 7th place

FIFUSA/AMF Futsal World Cup
 1982 - did not enter
 1985 - did not enter
 1988 - did not enter
 1991 - 4th place
 1994 - Quarterfinals
 1997 - 1st round
 2000 -  Runners-up (host)
 2003 -  3rd place
 2007 - Quarterfinals
 2011 - did not enter
 2015 - did not enter
 2019 - TBD

References

External links
 FIFA
 CONMEBOL

Bolivia
National sports teams of Bolivia
Futsal in Bolivia